The 2016 Argentine Republic motorcycle Grand Prix was the second round of the 2016 MotoGP season. It was held at the Autódromo Termas de Río Hondo in Santiago del Estero on 3 April 2016.

Classification

MotoGP
Due to tyre safety concerns, the race distance was shortened from 25 to 20 laps with a compulsory mid-race bike change.

Moto2

Moto3

Championship standings after the race (MotoGP)
Below are the standings for the top five riders and constructors after round two has concluded.

Riders' Championship standings

Constructors' Championship standings

 Note: Only the top five positions are included for both sets of standings.

References

Argentine
Motorcycle Grand Prix
Argentine Republic motorcycle Grand Prix
Argentine